Fiona Gammond (born 19 October 1992) is a British rower. In the 2016 World Rowing Championships, she won a gold medal in the women's coxless four event with Donna Etiebet, Holly Nixon and Holly Norton.

References

See also

British female rowers
World Rowing Championships medalists for Great Britain
Living people
1992 births
Youth Olympic gold medalists for Great Britain
Rowers at the 2010 Summer Youth Olympics
Rowers at the 2020 Summer Olympics